Ornithomya avicularia is a species of fly in the family Hippoboscidae. It is found in the  Palearctic.  
 The species prefers tree-dwelling birds as hosts.

References

Hippoboscidae
Flies described in 1758
Muscomorph flies of Europe
Taxa named by Carl Linnaeus